Highway 142 is a 2-lane limited-access road in Cumberland County, Nova Scotia, Canada. It links Highway 104 at Exit 5 in Salt Springs Station to the town of Springhill. The  highway crosses the Canadian National Railway main line about  outside Springhill. There are several logging roads that have access onto the highway.

History
The highway was built in the late 1960s as part of a political promise to Springhill residents who were upset that their town was bypassed by the new Trans-Canada Highway alignment on Highway 104; this being less than a decade after the town's economy had been hit by the Springhill Mining Disaster of 1958 which resulted in the closure of local coal mining.

Major intersections

References

Nova Scotia provincial highways
Roads in Cumberland County, Nova Scotia
Limited-access roads in Canada